Mohammad Sajjadul Hasan (25 September 1978 – 16 March 2007) was a Bangladeshi first-class cricketer.

Nicknamed 'Setu', he was an opening or top-order batsman for Khulna Division. Hasan was the leading runscorer in the 2002–03 Bangladeshi domestic season with 447 runs at 40.63.

He captained Khulna Division on two occasions in the first-class form of the game, against Rajshahi Division and Chittagong Division, but lost both games. He also has a stumping to his name, claimed during Khulna Division's match against Chittagong Division in 2005.

He died aged 28 in a road accident alongside Khulna Division teammate Manjural Islam Rana. In his 50-game career he made 2443 runs at 28.08 with 3 hundreds.

Notes

References
 
 Report of the accident
 CricketArchive player profile

1978 births
2007 deaths
Khulna Division cricketers
Bangladeshi cricketers
Road incident deaths in Bangladesh
Motorcycle road incident deaths